Ouderkerk (older Dutch: Ouwerkerk, English: Overkirk) may refer to:

 Ouderkerk, a former municipality in South Holland, Netherlands
 Ouderkerk aan den IJssel, a town in that former municipality
 Ouderkerk aan de Amstel, a town in North Holland, Netherlands
 Ouwerkerk, a town in Zeeland, Netherlands
 Coco “Colourbee” Ouwerkerk, a cartoonist and creator of Acception
 Henry de Nassau, Lord Overkirk (1640–1708), Dutch general and lord of Ouderkerk aan den IJssel